The 25th Legislative Assembly of Ontario was in session from June 9, 1955, until May 4, 1959, just prior to the 1959 general election. The majority party was the Ontario Progressive Conservative Party led by Leslie Frost.

Alfred Wallace Downer served as speaker for the assembly.

Notes

References 
Members in Parliament 25

Terms of the Legislative Assembly of Ontario
1955 establishments in Ontario
1959 disestablishments in Ontario